The 2008–09 Kentucky Wildcats men's basketball team represented the University of Kentucky in the college basketball season of 2008–09. The team's head coach was Billy Gillispie, who was in his second and final year as coach. The Wildcats played their home games at Rupp Arena in Lexington, Kentucky. The team's season started with a controversial early Midnight Madness event on October 10, 2008 which is not the traditional date for celebration that coincides with the first day of NCAA-sanctioned regular practice sessions that occurred on October 17, 2008.

On March 15, 2009, the Wildcats accepted a bid to the 2009 National Invitation Tournament, ending a streak of 17 consecutive appearances in the NCAA Men's Division I Basketball Championship dating back to 1992.

Roster

2008 signees

2008–09 schedule and results

|-
!colspan=12 style=|Exhibition

|-
!colspan=12 style=|Non-Conference Regular Season

|-
!colspan=12 style=|SEC Regular Season

|-
!colspan=12 style=|SEC Tournament 

|-
!colspan=12 style=|National Invitation Tournament

Season honors and awards

All-SEC

SEC Player of the Week

SEC Freshman of the Week

Pre-Season All-SEC

Class of 2009 signees
The signees who formed the 2009-10 recruiting classes are considered one of the best all-time recruiting classes

References

Kentucky Wildcats men's basketball seasons
Kentucky
Kentucky
Kentucky Wildcats
Kentucky Wildcats